Souheïl Ben Radhia (born August 26, 1985 in Bizerte) is a Tunisian footballer who currently plays for CA Bizertin.

Career
On March 2, 2010 Polish club Widzew Łódź signed him from Étoile Sportive du Sahel.

He made his Polish First League debut on 27 March 2010.

References

External links
 

1985 births
Living people
Tunisian footballers
CA Bizertin players
Espérance Sportive de Tunis players
Étoile Sportive du Sahel players
Widzew Łódź players
Ekstraklasa players
Expatriate footballers in Poland
Tunisian expatriates in Poland
People from Bizerte
Association football defenders